Louis Joseph Buffet (26 October 1818 – 7 July 1898) was a French statesman.

He was born at Mirecourt, Vosges.  After the revolution of February 1848 he was elected deputy for the department of the Vosges, and in the Assembly sat on the right, pronouncing for the repression of the insurrection of June 1848 and for Louis Napoleon Bonaparte. He was minister of agriculture from August to December 1849 and from August to October 1851.

Re-elected deputy in 1863, he was one of the supporters of the "Liberal Empire" of Émile Ollivier, and was finance minister in Ollivier's cabinet from January to 10 April 1870.  He was president of the National Assembly from 4 April 1872 to 10 March 1875, minister of the interior in 1875, and Prime Minister of France from 1875 to 1876. Having made himself obnoxious to the Republican party, he failed to secure a reëlection to the Assembly in 1876.  Then, elected senator for life (1876), he pronounced himself in favour of President MacMahon's failed attempt to seize political control on 16 May 1877.

Buffet had some oratorical talent, but shone most in opposition.

Buffet's Ministry, 10 March 1875 – 22 February 1876

Louis Joseph Buffet – President of the Council and Minister of the Interior
Louis Decazes – Minister of Foreign Affairs
Ernest Courtot de Cissey – Minister of War
Léon Say – Minister of Finance
Jules Armand Dufaure – Minister of Justice
Louis Raymond de Montaignac de Chauvance – Minister of Marine and Colonies
Henri-Alexandre Wallon – Minister of Public Instruction, Fine Arts, and Worship
Eugène Caillaux – Minister of Public Works
Vicomte de Meaux – Minister of Agriculture and Commerce

References

1818 births
1898 deaths
People from Mirecourt
Politicians from Grand Est
Party of Order politicians
Orléanists
Prime Ministers of France
Presidents of the Chamber of Deputies (France)
French Ministers of Agriculture and Commerce
French interior ministers
French Ministers of Finance
Government ministers of France
Members of the 1848 Constituent Assembly
Members of the National Legislative Assembly of the French Second Republic
Members of the 3rd Corps législatif of the Second French Empire
Members of the 4th Corps législatif of the Second French Empire
Members of the National Assembly (1871)
French life senators